This is a list of public art in Elkhart County, Indiana.

This list applies only to works of public art accessible in an outdoor public space. For example, this does not include artwork visible inside a museum.  

Most of the works mentioned are sculptures. When this is not the case (e.g., sound installation,) it is stated next to the title.

Bristol

Elkhart

Goshen

Notes

Buildings and structures in Elkhart County, Indiana
Elkhart County